"The Eagle" is a song written by Mack Vickery, Hank Cochran and Red Lane, and recorded by American country music artist Waylon Jennings.  It was released in February 1991 as the third single and title track from the 1990 album The Eagle.  The song reached #22 on the Billboard Hot Country Singles & Tracks chart, Jennings's last Top 40 hit. It was covered by Jamey Johnson and George Strait for Johnson's album Living for a Song: A Tribute to Hank Cochran.

Chart performance

References

1990 songs
1991 singles
Waylon Jennings songs
Jamey Johnson songs
George Strait songs
Songs written by Hank Cochran
Songs written by Mack Vickery
Songs written by Red Lane
Song recordings produced by Bob Montgomery (songwriter)
Epic Records singles